Kervin may refer to:

People

Kervin Castro (born 1999), Venezuelan professional baseball pitcher for the San Francisco Giants
Kervin Ebanks (born 1989), Caymanian cricketer
Kervin García (born 1990), Guatemalan footballer 
Kervin Godon (born 1981), Mauritian international footballer 
Kervin Marc (born 1975), English cricketer 
Kervin Piñerua (1991 – 2016), Venezuelan volleyball player
Alison Kervin, sports editor of the Mail on Sunday

Planet
Meanings of minor planet names: 6001–7000 (Kervin), owned by the first discover, Masayuki Iwamoto.